Anrich Arno Nortje (born 16 November 1993) is a South African cricketer. He made his international debut for the South Africa cricket team in March 2019. In July 2020, Nortje was named the newcomer of the year at Cricket South Africa's annual awards ceremony.

Domestic and T20 franchise career
He was included in Eastern Province's squad for the 2016 Africa T20 Cup. In October 2018, he was named in Cape Town Blitz's squad for the first edition of the Mzansi Super League T20 tournament. Midway through the tournament, he was ruled out with an ankle injury. In December 2018, he was bought by the Kolkata Knight Riders in the player auction for the 2019 Indian Premier League. However, in March 2019, he was ruled out of the tournament with a shoulder injury.

In September 2019, he was named in the squad for the Cape Town Blitz team for the 2019 Mzansi Super League tournament. He was released by the Kolkata Knight Riders ahead of the 2020 IPL auction. In July 2020, he was named in the St Lucia Zouks squad for the 2020 Caribbean Premier League. However, Nortje was one of five South African cricketers to miss the tournament, after failing to confirm travel arrangements in due time. In August 2020, Nortje joined the Delhi Capitals as a replacement for Chris Woakes in the 2020 Indian Premier League. On 14 October 2020, during the 30th match of the 2020 IPL, Nortje bowled at the speed of 156.22 km/h (97 mph) to Jos Buttler of Rajasthan Royals, the fastest delivery to date in the IPL.

In April 2021, he was named in Eastern Province's squad, ahead of the 2021–22 cricket season in South Africa.

He was selected for the Washington Freedom squad in March 2023, ahead of the inaugural season of Major League Cricket in USA.￼

International career
In February 2019, he was named in South Africa's One Day International (ODI) squad for their series against Sri Lanka. He made his ODI debut for South Africa against Sri Lanka on 3 March 2019. In March 2019, he was named in South Africa's Twenty20 International (T20I) squad also for the series against Sri Lanka, but was ruled out of T20I series due to injury.

In April 2019, he was named in South Africa's squad for the 2019 Cricket World Cup. However, on 7 May 2019, he was ruled out of the tournament with a hand injury and was replaced by Chris Morris.

In August 2019, he was named in South Africa's Test and Twenty20 International (T20I) squads for their series against India. He made his T20I debut for South Africa, against India, on 18 September 2019. He made his Test debut for South Africa, also against India, on 10 October 2019. In January 2020, in the fourth Test against England, Nortje took his maiden five-wicket haul in Test cricket. In March 2020, he was awarded with a national contract by Cricket South Africa ahead of the 2020–21 season.

In September 2021, Nortje was named in South Africa's squad for the 2021 ICC Men's T20 World Cup.

References

External links
 

1993 births
Living people
People from Uitenhage
Cricketers from the Eastern Cape
South African cricketers
South Africa Test cricketers
South Africa One Day International cricketers
South Africa Twenty20 International cricketers
Cricketers at the 2019 Cricket World Cup
Cape Town Blitz cricketers
Delhi Capitals cricketers
Eastern Province cricketers
Warriors cricketers